"Makin' Happy" is a song by American singer and songwriter Crystal Waters, released in 1991 as the second single from her debut studio album, Surprise (1991). It  was the follow-up to Waters' hugely successful song "Gypsy Woman" and achieved moderate success in European countries. In the US, the song spent one week at number-one on the Billboard Dance Club Songs chart and it also reached the top of the Canadian RPM Dance/Urban chart. In the United Kingdom, the single peaked at number 18.

Critical reception
Alex Henderson from AllMusic complimented the song as a "highly addictive and enjoyable house/neo-disco fare". Larry Flick from Billboard described it as "a frenetic and hypnotic jam". He remarked that it "maintains a similar deep house vibe [as her first single]. Waters more than proves her songwriting talent here, while her unique feline vocals will test some and delight others." Andy Kastanas from The Charlotte Observer declared it as "a housy tune that's bound to, well, make you happy, what else?" Machgiel Bakker from Music & Media called it "pop-house". 

An editor also commented in an album review, "Just repeat the words 'Makin' Happy' endlessly and you'll get a good flavour of 'Gypsy Woman, Part II'." James Hamilton from Music Week'''s RM Dance Update wrote that "the strange nasally pitched girl is less Eartha Kitt-like for her follow-up to 'Gypsy Woman', a jauntly trotting repetitive canterer with some "ooh wee ooh wee ooh" (and a guy's "so happy") instead of all the "la da dee, la dee da"." Stuart Maconie from New Musical Express declared it as "a spectacularly bangin' tune". Jonathan Bernstein from Spin'' described it as "ebullient".

Track listing and formats

Charts

References

1993 singles
Crystal Waters songs
1991 songs
Mercury Records singles